Han Vodka is an 80 proof vodka from Korea made from barley, rice and "pure spring water". This smooth and clean tasting Vodka is made from barley and rice which is fermented and distilled in small batches. It is imported by Progressive Beverages located in Fullerton, California. Progressive Beverages also imports Han Soju which is a 48 proof Korean Soju. It is available in plain Soju form as well as 4 Soju based flavors: Citruss, Fire, Teq and Cane.  You can find HAN Soju and flavors information at www.HANspirits.com. It is only available in the California Market at this time and is distributed by Young's Market Company, Inc. located in Tustin, California.  

Some reviews say that HAN has a smooth taste. Others say that it tastes like fortified sake.

References

External links 
Official website

Korean distilled drinks
Korean vodkas